Fox's Biscuits is a British biscuit manufacturer, founded by the Fox family in a terraced house, 17 Whitaker Street, Batley in West Yorkshire in 1853. The head office and main factory are based in the town and has another site in Wesham in Lancashire. Its biscuits are exported to Europe, North America, and Asia. The house in Whittaker Street still stands. The company was purchased by Northern Foods in 1977, which was acquired by 2 Sisters Food Group in 2011. In October 2020 Ferrero bought Fox's Biscuits for £246 million.

The business is known for mass-market and chocolate-covered biscuit bars such as Rocky, Classic, Echo, Crunch Creams and children's favourite Party Rings. The company also makes own brand biscuit products for a number of supermarkets and makes Farley's Rusks for Heinz.

History
The company was founded in 1853 by Michael Spedding, who worked from his small bakehouse in Batley making "eatables" to sell at feasts and fairs held throughout the north of England. His daughter Hannah provided the name for the company when she married Fred Ellis Fox in the late 1800s.

The bakery moved to former wartime allotments site in Batley in 1927. In 1960 it became a limited company and was named Fox's Biscuits. The Uttoxeter site was operated as Elkes Biscuits before merging in 2003. In September 2013, the Yorkshire Society unveiled a White Rose plaque at the site of the first bakery on Whitaker Street: the first time that the society had presented a plaque to commemorate the formation of a business. In 2020, Fox's Biscuits won the Lausanne Index Prize - Bronze Award.

Vinnie
On 28 May 2008, Fox's Biscuits launched a TV ad campaign and £5 million marketing campaign centred on "Vinnie", a "danda", cross between a dog and a panda, meant to be Fox's "number one fan" who had travelled across the Atlantic to make sure everybody knew who makes his favourite biscuits (which he mispronounces with a "w" instead of a "u"). The idea of Vinnie was developed with the animation team behind Disney's The Chronicles of Narnia.

Products

The company website contains nutritional and allergy information as well as descriptions of each product. The biscuits currently manufactured by Fox's are:

Rocky (Chocolate, Caramel, Orange[Limited Edition], Crispy Crunch)
Rocky Chockas (Double Choc, Toffee, Honeycomb)
Rocky Rocks (Chocolate or Crispy Crunch)
Echo (Mint, Orange, Chocolate)
Classic
Cookie Bars
Triple
Viennese (Milk Chocolate, Dark Chocolate)
Millionaire's Shortcake
Shortcake Rounds
Extremely Chocolatey Cookie
Chunk Cookie (Dark Chocolate, Milk Chocolate, White Chocolate)
Crunch Creams (Ginger, Golden, Chocolate Fudge, Classic, Double Choc)
Creams (Rich Tea, Jam Ring, Malted Milk, Nice, Classic)
Crinkles (Butter, Ginger, Coconut, Milk Chocolate)
Dunkers (Oaty, Shortcake)
Sports
Party Rings
Minis (Buttery and Oaty)
Bourbon biscuit
Creations
Speciality
Speciality Brandy Snaps
Favourites
Luxury Chocolate Carton
Wholemeal Cracker (Original, Tomato & Red Pepper, Cheese & Onion and Sunflower Seed & Honey)

See also

Burton's Biscuit Company
Huntley & Palmers
Jacob Fruitfield Food Group
Tunnock's
United Biscuits

References

External links 

Bakeries of the United Kingdom
Food brands of the United Kingdom
Northern Foods
Companies based in Kirklees
Biscuit brands
1977 mergers and acquisitions
2011 mergers and acquisitions
2020 mergers and acquisitions
Ferrero SpA